The 1999 season of the Toppserien, the highest women's football (soccer) league in Norway, began on 24 April 1999 and ended on 16 October 1999.

18 games were played with 3 points given for wins and 1 for draws. Number nine and ten were relegated, while two teams from the First Division were promoted through a playoff round.

Asker won the league.

League table

Top goalscorers
 23 goals:
  Kjersti Thun, Asker
 19 goals:
  Christin Lilja, Athene Moss
 16 goals:
  Marianne Pettersen, Asker
  Ingrid Camilla Fosse Sæthre, Bjørnar
  Line Anzjøn, Klepp
 15 goals:
  Solveig Gulbrandsen, Kolbotn
  Ragnhild Gulbrandsen, Trondheims-Ørn
  Ann Kristin Aarønes, Trondheims-Ørn
 13 goals:
  Brit Sandaune, Trondheims-Ørn
 11 goals:
  Linda Medalen, Asker
  Tonje Hansen, Kolbotn
  Elene Moseby, Setskog/Høland
  Trine Rønning, Trondheims-Ørn

Promotion and relegation
 Sandviken and Kaupanger were relegated to the First Division.
 Byåsen and Larvik were promoted from the First Division through playoff.

References

League table
Fixtures
Goalscorers

Top level Norwegian women's football league seasons
1
Nor
Nor